Athearnia anthonyi is a rare species of freshwater snail in the family Pleuroceridae. Its common name is Anthony's riversnail. It is native to three rivers in the Tennessee River system in the United States: the main branch and the Sequatchie River and Limestone Creek.

References

Pleuroceridae
Gastropods described in 1854
ESA endangered species